Uunarteq, formerly Kap Tobin and Unarteg, is an abandoned settlement in the Sermersooq municipality in eastern Greenland, located  south of Ittoqqortoormiit.

History 
The settlement was founded by fishermen and their families in 1926. In 1947 a telegraph and weather station were erected; the station itself employed roughly 20 people. At its largest extent, the settlement was home for approximately 120 people, with its own grade school. The village housed a seismic station until 1960, when it was closed down. Uunarteq was abandoned as a settlement in the mid-1980s, when the local weather station was closed. Today the remaining buildings serve as cottages for the inhabitants of nearby Ittoqqortoormiit. The last family left the settlement in 2004.

Climate 
The place of the outlying village has a tundra climate (Köppen: ET), like most coastal places in Greenland, where temperatures above zero can remain on average in the summer months, although much of the year is like a long winter.

Places of interest
In the area ruins of an early Inuit village can be found.

Notes

References

Former populated places in Greenland